The 1974–75 Chicago Cougars season was the Chicago Cougars third and final season of operation in the World Hockey Association (WHA). The Cougars finished third in the East, but did not have enough points to qualify for the playoffs.

Offseason

Regular season

Final standings

Game log

Player stats

Note: Pos = Position; GP = Games played; G = Goals; A = Assists; Pts = Points; +/- = plus/minus; PIM = Penalty minutes; PPG = Power-play goals; SHG = Short-handed goals; GWG = Game-winning goals
      MIN = Minutes played; W = Wins; L = Losses; T = Ties; GA = Goals-against; GAA = Goals-against average; SO = Shutouts;

Awards and records

Transactions

Draft picks
Chicago's draft picks at the 1974 WHA Amateur Draft.

Farm teams

See also
1974–75 WHA season

References

External links

Chic
Chic
Chicago Cougars seasons